Mewa River is a major tributory of Tamur River which forms a part of Saptakoshi River system. The river is located in Taplejung district of eastern Nepal. The Mewa river converges with the Tamur river near the Hangdrung village.

Biodiversity
The Mewa river valley has a landscape lying between 700-3900m above msl. The river valley provides shelter for birds during the migration period.

Infrastructures
The river has a large hydropower potential and a number of projects are under development such as
Me Khola Hydropower Project (50 MW) 
Middle Mewa Hydropower Project (49 MW)
Palun Khola Hydropower Project (21 MW), in the tributory of Mewa river

See also
List of rivers of Nepal

References

Rivers of Koshi Province